Druya is a historic townlet in Vitebsk Region, Belarus, about 30 km northeast of Braslaw. It is located on the left bank of the Western Dvina, at the mouth of the Druyka River, opposite the Latvian parish of Piedruja. The population is about 1,500 (2006).

History
Medieval Druja was a stronghold of the Massalski princely family fought over by the Grand Duchies of Lithuania and Muscovy through much of the 16th and 17th centuries. Maciej Stryjkowski mentions it in his chronicle when describing the events of 1386. Ownership passed to the Sapieha family in the 17th century. The fortified suburb of Sapieżyn was founded by Jan Stanisław Sapieha in 1618. The illuminated Druja Gospels date from 1580.

Monasteries 

Druja's oldest building is a Baroque Catholic church of the Trinity in the part of town known as Sapiezhyn. It was built in the 1640s and later expanded. The church was previously part of a Bernardine monastery. 

In the interwar period Jurgis Matulaitis-Matulevičius initiated the foundation of a Marian monastery for Belarusians in Druya - which was initially led by Andrei Tsikota. The monastery housed a school where a number of prominent Belarusian personalities were educated, including Cheslaus Sipovich, Jazep Hermanovich, Tamaš Padzjava and Uladzislaŭ Čarniaǔski.

Jewish community
Druja was formerly known for its thriving Jewish community, around 2,200 Jews lived in Druya on the eve of World War II (half of the whole local population). The parents of writer Saul Bellow hailed from Druja.

Most of the town's Jewish population was killed during the Holocaust by Nazi German forces in 1942. The German troops had occupied Druja by early July 1941; a ghetto was created in April–May 1942. On June 17, 1942, the Germans and the local police surrounded the ghetto. A fire broke out and burned the ghetto and the nearby orthodox church. The Jews from the ghetto were gathered near the Druyka River and shot into a large grave. More than 1,000 Jews were killed in Druya.

Notable people associated with Druya
Fabijan Abrantovich, Belarusian Roman Catholic priest and social activist,  was active in Druya for some time
Vladimir Beneshevich was born here
Alter Druyanov,  writer, editor, translator, folklorist, journalist, historian of early Zionism, and Zionist activist was born here
Jazep Hermanovich,  Belarusian Eastern Catholic priest, poet and Gulag survivor  was active in Druya for some time
Jury Kashyra, Roman Catholic priest, was active in Druya for some time
Abraham Resnick studied under Rabbi Abraham Zadok Bagin in Druya
Ceslaus Sipovich attended catholic school in Druja
Andrei Tsikota,  Belarusian Roman Catholic and Greek Catholic priest, was active in Druya for some time

References

External links
 

Populated places in Vitebsk Region
Agrotowns in Belarus
Disnensky Uyezd
Wilno Voivodeship (1926–1939)
Shtetls
Belarus–Latvia border
Holocaust locations in Belarus